Zinc finger protein 576 is a protein that in humans is encoded by the ZNF576 gene.

References

Further reading 

Molecular biology
Proteins
Proteomics